BroadwayWorld is a theatre news website based in New York City covering Broadway, Off-Broadway, regional, and international theatre productions. The website publishes theatre news, interviews, reviews, and other coverage related to theater. It also includes an online message board for theater fans.

History 
The site was founded in 2003 to cover theater news. As of September 2018, the website had a readership of 5.5 million monthly online visitors and an Alexa PageRank of 16,156 worldwide. The site also produces annual fan-voted awards and competitions related to various types of production.

BroadwayWorld added a pay transparency rule to their job site in March 2021 due to the advocacy of On Our Team and Costume Professionals for Wage Equity.

References

External links
 

American entertainment news websites
Theatre in the United States
Companies based in New York City
2003 establishments in New York City